Test and Training Range may refer to:

Nevada Test and Training Range, the former Tonopah Bombing Range and subsequent Nellis Air Force Range in southern Nevada
Nevada Test and Training Range (military unit), the NTTR's military unit (former 98th Range Wing)
Nevada Test Site, an NTTR area (former Nevada Proving Ground)
Strategic Training Ranges, various Strategic Air Command areas with Oil Burner routes used for testing aircrews and equipment (e.g., Radar Bomb Scoring)
Utah Test and Training Range, a complex of former World War II and Cold War ranges:
Dugway Proving Ground, the former Army range in western Utah
Hill Air Force Range, the former USAF bombing range near Salt Lake City
Wendover Range Complex, the former range in western Utah used for aircrew testing and training for World War II bombing of Hiroshima and Nagasakijz.        

Ranges of the United States Air Force